The John Cullen Award was awarded annually by the International Hockey League to the player judged to contribute the most to his team, while overcoming adversity, including injury, illness, and other setbacks. The award was originally named the Comeback Player of the Year Award until 1999, when it was renamed after John Cullen, who overcame non-Hodgkin lymphoma.

Winners

References
John Cullen Award www.hockeydb.com
Comeback Player of the Year www.hockeydb.com

International Hockey League (1945–2001) trophies